This article contains two versions of the list of kings of Burundi, the traditional version before 1680 and the modern genealogy. The Kingdom of Burundi was ruled by sovereigns, titled mwami (plural abami), whose regnal names followed a cycle: Ntare (meaning 'lion'), Mwezi (meaning 'moon'), Mutaga, and Mwambutsa. Traditionally, it was thought that there had been four complete cycles but the modern genealogy indicates that there were only two complete cycles, starting with Ntare III Rushatsi.

In the 16th century, Burundi was a kingdom characterized by a hierarchical political authority and tributary economic exchange. A mwami headed a princely aristocracy (ganwa) which owned most of the land governing its subjects with superiority and required a tribute, or tax, from local farmers and herders who lived in forests. The Tutsi monarchy ruled the nation for centuries, but became largely ceremonial with the colonization of the nation by the German Empire in 1899. The kings continued to nominally rule through German and Belgian colonial periods, and the monarchy continued after the nation gained independence from Belgium in 1962. Burundi ceased to be a monarchy when king Ntare V Ndizeye was deposed by his Prime Minister and Chief of Staff, Colonel Michel Micombero, who abolished the monarchy and declared a republic following the November 1966 coup d'état.

Kings of Burundi

Traditional list
The dates before 1900 are estimates.
 Ntare I Rushatsi Cambarantama:  1530– 1550
 Mwezi I Baridamunka:  1550– 1580
 Mutaga I Mutabazi:  1580– 1600
 Mwambutsa I Nkomati:  1600– 1620
 Ntare II Kibogora:  1620– 1650
 Mwezi II Nyaburunga:  1650– 1680
 Mutaga II Senyamwiza Mutamo:  1680– 1700
 Mwambutsa II Nyarushamba:  1700– 1720
 Ntare III Kivimira Semuganzashamba:  1720– 1750
 Mwezi III Kavuyimbo (Ndagushimiye):  1750– 1780
 Mutaga III Sebitungwa:  1780– 1800
 Mwambutsa III Mbonyuburundi (Mbariza):  1800– 1830
 Ntare IV Runzi (Rutaganzwa Rugamba):  1830– 1850
 Mwezi IV Gisabo Bikata-Bijoga:  1850–1908
 Mutaga IV Mbikije:  1908–1915
 Mwambutsa IV Bangiricenge Rubangishamiheto: 1915–1966
 Ntare V Ndizeye: 1966

Modern list

 Ntare III Rushatsi:  1680– 1709
 Mwezi III Ndagushimiye:  1709– 1739
 Mutaga III Senyamwiza Mutamo:  1739– 1767
 Mwambutsa III Serushambo Butama:  1767– 1796 (also known as Mwambutsa III Mbariza)
 Ntare IV Rutaganzwa Rugamba:  1796– 1850
 Mwezi IV Gisabo: 1840–1908; 
 Mutaga IV Mbikije:  1892 – 30 November 1915; 
 Mwambutsa IV Bangiriceng: 6 May 1912 – 26 March 1977; 
 Ntare V Ndizeye: 2 December 1947 – 29 April 1972;

Royal Standard

See also

 History of Burundi
 Kingdom of Burundi
 President of Burundi
 List of presidents of Burundi
 Prime Minister of Burundi

References

Burundi
Burundian monarchy
 
Kings
Kings